Fomenkovo is a rural locality (a selo) in Novotroitskoye Rural Settlement, Petropavlovsky District, Voronezh Oblast, Russia. The population was 277 as of 2010. There are 6 streets.

Geography 
Fomenkovo is located 21 km east of Petropavlovka (the district's administrative centre) by road. Novotroitskoye is the nearest rural locality.

References 

Rural localities in Petropavlovsky District, Voronezh Oblast